The Airborne Toxic Event is the debut studio album by American rock band The Airborne Toxic Event. It was first released on August 5, 2008, through Majordomo Records. It was later re-released by Island Records on March 16, 2009, following the band's signing to the label. The entire album was recorded using a recording studio in the home of Pete Min, the band's producer.

The album was released in the UK on February 9, 2009 and features three bonus tracks. The album's first single, "Gasoline", was released on November 17, 2008. "Sometime Around Midnight" was released on February 2, 2009, and later reached #4 on the Billboard Hot Modern Rock Tracks chart.

Track listing

Singles
 "Gasoline" (November 17, 2008)
 "Gasoline" – 3:20
 "The Winning Side" – 4:16
 "Sometime Around Midnight" (February 2, 2009)
 "Sometime Around Midnight" – 5:03
 "Innocence" (Acoustic) – 8:50
 "Happiness Is Overrated" (June 8, 2009)
 "Happiness Is Overrated"
 "I Don't Want to Be on TV"

Personnel
 Mikel Jollett – vocals, guitar, keyboards
 Steven Chen – lead guitar, keyboards
 Anna Bulbrook – keyboards, viola, backing vocals
 Noah Harmon – bass
 Daren Taylor – drums
 Evren Göknar - Mastering Engineer (Capitol Mastering)

Charts

References

2008 debut albums
Shout! Factory albums
The Airborne Toxic Event albums